Actias felicis is a moth in the family Saturniidae. It is found in China (Tibet).

The larvae have been recorded feeding on Pinus species, including Pinus radiata.

References

Felicis
Moths described in 1896
Moths of Asia